Mustin is a municipality in Mecklenburg-Vorpommern, Germany.

Mustin may also refer to:

 Mustin, Schleswig-Holstein, a municipality in Schleswig-Holstein, Germany
 Mustin family, an American family with a tradition of service in the United States Navy
 Henry C. Mustin (disambiguation)
 Burt Mustin (1884–1977), American actor
 , the name of more than one United States Navy ship

See also